The Ondaine or Ondenon is a river in the Loire department of France. It is a right tributary of the Loire.

Geography

When passing through the town of La Ricamarie it takes the name Ondaine. Its basin covers   mostly in the department of the Loire, but also in part of Haute-Loire.

The Ondaine is one of the rivers of the Loire Valley covered by "river contracts" that are supported by the General Council of the Loire, the Rhône-Alpes region, the Water Agencies, and the State.

Communes and cantons crossed 

The Ondaine flows through the department of the Loire, passing from upstream to downstream through the communes of Planfoy (source), Saint-Genest-Malifaux, La Ricamarie, Le Chambon-Feugerolles, Firminy, Fraisses, Saint-Paul-en-Cornillon, Unieux (confluence) and Caloire.
In terms of cantons, The Ondaine rises in the canton of Saint-Genest-Malifaux, passes through or beside the cantons of Le Chambon-Feugerolles, Saint-Genest-Malifaux and the canton of Firminy at its mouth.

Tributaries

The Ondaine has twelve named tributaries of which the seven major tributaries are:
Cotatay (left) 10.5 km with seven communes and five tributaries referenced.
Valchérie (left) 10.7 km with five communes and two tributaries referenced.
Malval (left) 3.7 km with two communes and two tributaries referenced.
Echapre or Echarpe (left) 9.8 km with six communes and three tributaries referenced.
Borde-Matin (right) 4.1 km with four communes without tributaries referenced.
Gampille (left) 12.5 km with seven communes and ten tributaries referenced.
Egotay (right) 5.9 km with four communes and two tributaries referenced.

Hydrology and flooding

On 5 June 2007 a major flood on the Ondaine and small tributaries upstream caused by major storms flooded part of the city of Le Chambon-Feugerolles and caused extensive damage but no casualties.
The weather service had issued a warning that storms could be locally strong.

Facilities and ecology

Ondenon dam
Cotatay dam
Treatment plant before the confluence
The river was an open sewer in the late 1990s. It now houses fish species such as brown trout, minnow, gudgeon, sculpin, stone loach, European chub and perch. 
It is again a first class stream.

References
Notes

Citations

Rivers of France
Rivers of Auvergne-Rhône-Alpes
Rivers of Loire (department)